Players and pairs who neither have high enough rankings nor receive wild cards may participate in a qualifying tournament held one week before the annual Wimbledon Tennis Championships.

Seeds

  Gilles Müller (second round)
  Christophe Rochus (qualified)
  Frederico Gil (qualified)
  Philipp Petzschner (qualified)
  Robert Kendrick (qualifying competition)
  Go Soeda (second round)
  Kristian Pless (second round)
  Paul Capdeville (second round)
  Flavio Cipolla (qualifying competition)
  Amer Delic (first round)
  Sam Warburg (first round)
  Iván Navarro (first round)
  Sergiy Stakhovsky (qualified)
  Stéphane Bohli (second round)
  Mikhail Kukushkin (first round)
  Rik de Voest (qualifying competition)
  Jan Hernych (qualified)
  Jesse Levine (qualified)
  Andreas Beck (qualified)
  Alun Jones (first round)
  Andrey Golubev (second round)
  Aisam-ul-Haq Qureshi (second round)
  Édouard Roger-Vasselin (qualified)
  Adrian Cruciat (qualifying competition)
  Leonardo Mayer (first round)
  Olivier Patience (qualifying competition)
  Harel Levy (first round)
  Dušan Vemić (first round)
  Joseph Sirianni (first round)
  Mikhail Ledovskikh (first round)
  Peter Wessels (withdrew)
  Simon Stadler (qualified)

Qualifiers

  Andreas Beck
  Christophe Rochus
  Frederico Gil
  Philipp Petzschner
  Kevin Kim
  Édouard Roger-Vasselin
  Izak van der Merwe
  Jesse Levine
  Pavel Šnobel
  Stefano Galvani
  Alexander Peya
  Jan Hernych
  Sergiy Stakhovsky
  Simon Stadler
  Chris Eaton
  Dawid Olejniczak

Lucky losers

  Ilija Bozoljac
  Tobias Kamke

Qualifying draw

First qualifier

Second qualifier

Third qualifier

Fourth qualifier

Fifth qualifier

Sixth qualifier

Seventh qualifier

Eighth qualifier

Ninth qualifier

Tenth qualifier

Eleventh qualifier

Twelfth qualifier

Thirteenth qualifier

Fourteenth qualifier

Fifteenth qualifier

Sixteenth qualifier

External links

 2008 Wimbledon Championships – Men's draws and results at the International Tennis Federation

Men's Singles Qualifying
Wimbledon Championship by year – Men's singles qualifying